Sir Alan Hylton Ward (born 15 February 1938) is a former judge of the Court of Appeal of England and Wales.

Early life and education
Ward was born and raised in South Africa and practised as an Attorney of the Supreme Court (solicitor), occasionally being instructed by Nelson Mandela and Oliver Tambo. In 1961, he moved to England to take a second degree, reading law at Cambridge.

Legal career
He was called to the bar (Gray's Inn) in 1964, becoming a bencher in 1988, and was made a Queen's Counsel in 1984. Ward was appointed a High Court judge on 5 October 1988. He was assigned to the Family Division and given the customary knighthood. On 13 February 1995, he was appointed a Lord Justice of Appeal. He reached mandatory retirement on 15 February 2013.

Notable rulings

Separating conjoined twins
In 2000, Ward, together with Lord Justice Brooke and Lord Justice Walker (now Lord Walker of Gestingthorpe) made the decision to separate conjoined twins Gracie and Rosie Attard, refusing their parents' appeal, despite the fact the weaker twin (Rosie) would certainly die. After the surgery, Rosie died and Gracie Attard survived and returned to her native Malta.

Solicitors bills
In Ralph Hume Garry (a firm) v Gwillim 2002 EWCA Civ 1500, a client sued for outstanding legal fees appealed against a refusal at first instance to strike out the claim against him on the basis that most of the bills did not bona fide comply with section 64 of the Solicitors Act 1974. The judgment contained a lengthy discussion by Ward LJ of the statutory history and the development of the case law with respect to the requirements for solicitors’ bills.

Ward reaffirmed the well-established requirement that a solicitor's bill must allow the client to have sufficient information to decide whether to seek taxation, and held that the proper principle was that there must be something in the written bill to indicate the ambit of the work, but that inadequacies in the bill of description of the work done may be redressed by accompanying documents or the client's knowledge. The appeal was dismissed as each bill was obviously and latterly expressly for professional charges, and also identified the matter and the periods of time they applied to.  Therefore, the claim should not be struck out as the issue of adequacy of the bills (together with the client’s knowledge) was a triable matter.

Sex discrimination
In a landmark ruling on 21 December 2004, Ward, together with Lord Justice Baker and Lady Justice Arden—on the basis of EU Council Directive 79/7/EEC—also ruled against the Secretary of State for Work and Pensions on the ground of sex discrimination for withholding from a separated father with shared care of his child receipt of the appropriate Job Seeker's Allowance child additions (JSA) because he was not in receipt of Child Benefit for his child.

Family life
He is married to leading London divorce solicitor, Helen Ward. The couple has homes in Little Venice and Suffolk 
They had twin daughters: Amelia (who died in 2001 aged 16 in a rock-fall accident in South Africa) and Kate.

References

External links
Court of Appeal judgment analysis from BBC News

1938 births
Living people
20th-century English judges
Family Division judges
Knights Bachelor
Lords Justices of Appeal
Ward, Lord Justice Ward
Members of the Privy Council of the United Kingdom
21st-century English judges